Zirkuh Gaduganlu (also Romanized as Zīrḵūh Gadūgānlū; also known as Gadūgānlū and Gadūgownlū) is a village in Sivkanlu Rural District, in the Central District of Shirvan County, North Khorasan Province, Iran. At the 2006 census, its population was 234, in 66 families.

References 

Populated places in Shirvan County